The octant projection or octants projection, is a type of map projection proposed the first time, in 1508, by Leonardo da Vinci in his Codex Atlanticus. Leonardo's authorship would be demonstrated by Christopher Tyler, who stated "For those projections dated later than 1508, his drawings should be effectively considered the original precursors..". 

The same page of the Codex contains sketches of eight other projections of the globe (those known in the late fifteenth century) studied by Leonardo, including Ptolemy's conical planisphere projection and Roselli's pseudocylindric projection.

Description

The octant projection it is the first known polyhedral map projection. The projection is neither conformal nor equal-area, bound by circular arcs, with no meridians and no parallels, in which the spherical surface of the earth is divided into eight octants, each flattened into the shape of a Reuleaux triangle. If transferred to an elastic support, it would be possible to cover with them the surface of a model of the earth's globe.

The eight triangles are oriented in a similar way as per two four-leaf clovers side by side, being the earth poles in the center of each clove. One of the sides of the eight triangles, (the one opposite to the center of the pseudo clover), is one fourth of the equator, the remaining two (those that converge to the center of the pseudo clover), are part of the two meridians that with the equator dissect the globe in the eight octants.

Similar projections

Projections also based on the Reuleaux triangle were published by: 
1549 – Oronce Finé
1556 – Le Testu
1580 – John Dee.
1616 – Nicolaas Geelkercken
1894 – Fiorini
1909 – Bernard J. S. Cahill
1916 – Anthiaume
1938 – Uhden
1955 – Keuning
1975 – Cahill–Keyes

History of authorship research
Although Leonardo's first description of the octant projection has been proved by Tyler, who decided to treat separately Leonardo's projection authorship (1508) from Leonardo's map authorship (1514), the other authors before him treat together the authorship of both map and projection, for they speak about "the eighth of a supposed globe represented in a plane" or about "globe sections" (Harrisse) or others about "gores", which are in fact a projection of the globe.

So, bearing in mind the fact that Tyler was the first scholar to mention the sketch of this projection in Codex Atlanticus in 2017, the authorship of the map it is not universally accepted, with some authors being completely against any minimal contribution from Leonardo, such as Henry Harrisse (1892), or Eugène Müntz (1899 – citing Harrisse authority from 1892, although none of them talks about the projection's sketch in Codex Atlanticus).

Other scholars accept explicitly both (map and projection: "the eight of a supposed globe represented in a plane"), completely as a Leonardo's work, describing the projection as the first of this type, among them, R. H. Major (1865) in his work Memoir on a mappemonde by Leonardo da Vinci, being the earliest map hitherto known containing the name of America, Grothe, the Enciclopedia universal ilustrada europeo-americana (1934), Snyder in his book Flattening the Earth (1993), Christoher Tyler in his paper (2014) "Leonardo da Vinci’s World Map", José Luis Espejo in his book (2012) Los mensajes ocultos de Leonardo Da Vinci, or David Bower in his work (2012) "The unusual projection for one of John Dee's maps of 1580".

Others also accept explicitly both (map and projection) as authentic, although leaving in the air Leonardo's direct hand, giving the authorship of the work to one of his disciples as Nordenskjold states in his book Facsimile-Atlas (1889) confirmed by Dutton (1995) and many others: "on account of the remarkable projection..not by Leonardo himself, but by some ignorant clerk", or Keunig (1955) being more precise: "by one of his followers at his direction".

Octant projection layouts

See also
World map
Codex Atlanticus
List of map projections
Leonardo's world map
Waterman butterfly projection
Waterman polyhedron
Bernard J. S. Cahill
José Luis Espejo Pérez

References

External links 

Proyecciones-cartograficas

Map projections
Works attributed to Leonardo da Vinci